South Hampstead High School is a private day school in Hampstead, north-west London, England, which was founded by the Girls' Day School Trust (GDST). It is for girls aged 4–18 with selective entry at ages 4+, 7+, 11+ and 16+ (Sixth Form).

History
The school was founded in 1876, the ninth school established by the GDST (previously known at the Girls' Public Day School Trust), with 27 pupils. Until 1886, the school was led by Rita/Rebecca Allen Olney; she left to found another school nearby with her sister Sarah Allen Olney who had been an assistant head at this school. The cross-dressing Mary Benton returned as headmistress when morale was low. The "Brigadier-General" built up the school until in the 1920s it was claimed that half the of the school's students then at university were studying scientific subjects. 

From 1946 until the late 1970s, it was a girls' direct grant grammar school, with around half the intake paid for by the local council. 

In January 2015, alumna Helena Bonham Carter, opened a new 7-storey building for the Senior School, designed by Hopkins Architects. In January 2020, the school unveiled a new state-of-the-art performance space, Waterlow Hall.

Staff

Head teachers
 Victoria Bingham (2017–present)
 Helen Pike (2013–2016)
 Jenny Stephen (2005–2013)
 Vivien Ainley (2001–2004)
 Jean Scott (1993–2001)
 Averil Burgess (1975–1993)
 Sheila Wiltshire (1969–1974) 
 Prunella Bodington (1954–1969)
 Muriel Potter (1927–1953 )
 Dorothy Walker (1918–1926) (Miss McGonigle 1926 one term)
 Mary Benton (1886–1918)
 Miss Allen-Olney (1876–1886)

Former teachers
 Edith Allen, mother of food writer Raymond Postgate and Dame Margaret Cole (who married G. D. H. Cole), and wife of classicist John Percival Postgate
 Rosalind Goodfellow, who taught history
 Marianne Lutz, Headmistress from 1959–83 of Sheffield High School for Girls taught history from 1947–59.
 Margaret Nevinson, suffragette, and mother of the painter Christopher R. W. Nevinson (taught classics in the 1880s)
 Marie Orliac, who taught French in 1907–1910, founder of the University des Lettres Francaises (1910, Marble Arch, West London) that would become in 1913 the Institut Francais du Royaume-Uni.

Academic results
In 2019, South Hampstead High School was ranked 13th in the country for A Level results, based on data collated by the Independent Schools Council (ISC).

Typically around one fifth of the student body goes on to study at the universities of Oxford and Cambridge.

School motto
 "Mehr Licht" – More Light (German)—the reputed last words of Johann Wolfgang von Goethe

Notable former pupils

 Katya Adler, journalist
 Helena Bonham Carter, actress
 Janet Neel Cohen, Baroness Cohen of Pimlico, author and former BBC governor
 Lilah Fear, figure skater
 Lynne Featherstone, Baroness Featherstone, Liberal Democrat MP from 2005 to 2015 for Hornsey and Wood Green
 Naomi Ishiguro, author
 Glynis Johns, actress
 Diana Kennedy, writer on Mexican food 
Dame Angela Lansbury, actress and author
 Joanna MacGregor, pianist
 Aries Moross, graphic designer
 Sophie Newton, entrepreneur 
 Julia Neuberger, rabbi
 Margaret Quass, educationalist
 Devika Rani, Indian actress
 Netta Rheinberg MBE, cricketer
 Jordan Scott, photographer, daughter of Ridley Scott
 Rachel Sylvester, columnist at The Times
 Fay Weldon, author
 Olivia Williams, actress

See also
 List of direct grant grammar schools

References

External links

Private girls' schools in London
Educational institutions established in 1876
Schools of the Girls' Day School Trust
Private schools in the London Borough of Camden
1876 establishments in England